Thomas John Sandars (born February 1976, St. Marylebone, London) is a continuity announcer for BBC Radio 4 and a newsreader for the BBC World Service.

Education
From 1989 to 1994, Sandars was educated at The Oratory School, a Roman Catholic boarding independent school for boys in the village of Woodcote in Oxfordshire, followed by the University of Reading, where he studied Typography and Graphic Communication. In 1995 he was the Editor of the student union newspaper, Spark. He is married to Kate.

Career
He started at Radio Shropshire in 1998, moving to BBC WM. He was a presenter on Midlands Today and was also their political reporter for The Midlands at Westminster.

Sandars was then a freelance newsreader for the BBC World Service. He has been a BBC Radio 4 continuity announcer since June 2017 and a newsreader since May 2018.

He was a newsreader and presenter for BBC Radio 5 Live for ten years from 2003. Between 2007 and 2017 he read news bulletins for BBC Radio 2 and for Radio 6 Music  He is also an arts correspondent and can be heard on Radio 4 political programmes.

On the 9 April 2021, Sandars' voice was heard breaking into all BBC Radio programmes to announce the death of Prince Philip.

References

External links
 Website
 Twitter

Video clips
 Sky News
 Innocent Drinks

Alumni of the University of Reading
BBC newsreaders and journalists
BBC Radio 5 Live presenters
English political journalists
People educated at The Oratory School
Sky News newsreaders and journalists
1976 births
Living people